Alessandro Gassmann (born 24 February 1965) is an Italian actor and film director.

Early life 
Gassmann was born in Rome, Italy, the son of Italian actor Vittorio Gassman and French actress Juliette Mayniel. He is of  German, Jewish and French descent.

Career 
He debuted at 17 in the autobiographical film Di padre in figlio, written and directed with his father, under whose tutoring he later studied in the Theatre Workshop of Florence. Among his theatrical activity, he was noted for his playing in Pier Paolo Pasolini's Affabulazione (1984).

In 1996 he began an artistic partnership with his friend Gianmarco Tognazzi with whom he co-acted in popular movies like Uomini senza donne, Facciamo festa, Teste di cocco, Lovest, I miei più cari amici and Natale a Beverly Hills, in the theatrical version of Some Like It Hot and as dubbers of the Disney cartoon Eldorado.
In 1997 he won international acclaim with Ferzan Özpetek's Hamam.

He was subsequently chosen by Yves Saint Laurent as testimonial for his perfume Opium, and posed in a nude calendar for the Italian magazine Max. He also became a testimonial for Lancia of Musa, as well as appearing in an ad for the Glen Grant liquor.
As an actor, he worked for several TV miniseries and, in France, in the action movie Transporter 2 (opposite Jason Statham), produced by Luc Besson. In 2006, Gassmann appeared in the comedy Non prendere impegni stasera.

He then took part in TV dramas such as Piccolo mondo antico, Le stagioni del cuore, La guerra è finita and La Sacra Famiglia; he also acted in the US action film Transporter 2 and in Italy in the comedy Non prendere impegni stasera.

In 2008 he acted in the film Caos calmo as the brother of the main lead, interpreted by Nanni Moretti. For this role, he was honoured by many awards: the David di Donatello award for a supporting actor, the Ciak d'oro, the Nastro d'Argento and the Globo d'oro of the foreign press. In the same year, he adapted for the stage the teleplay 12 Angry Men, written by Reginald Rose in 1954 that was made into a film by Sidney Lumet in 1957:  the performance was taken up again in 2009, year in which he also appeared as leading actor in  4 padri single by Paolo Monico, Ex by Fausto Brizzi and Il compleanno by Marco Filiberti as well in the TV miniseries Pinocchio directed by Alberto Sironi.

He is acting Tutor in Cinecittà at Act Multimedia.

Personal life 
Since 1998, Gassmann has been married to actress Sabrina Knaflitz. They have a son, Leo.

Filmography

Film 

 Di padre in figlio (1982)
 Big Deal After 20 Years (1987)
 Devils of Monza (1987)
 When We Were Repressed (1992)
 Ostinato destino (1992)
 Golden Balls (1993)
 Sì, ma vogliamo un maschio (1994)
 A Month by the Lake (1995)
 Uomini senza donne (1996)
 Stella's Favor (1996)
 Facciamo fiesta (1997)
 Lovest (1997)
 Hamam (1997)
 My Dearest Friends (1998)
 Toni (1999)
 La bomba (1999)
 Teste di cocco (2000)
 The Bankers of God: The Calvi Affair (2002)
 Guardians of the Clouds (2004)
 La sperarazione (2005)
 Transporter 2 (2005)
 Don't Make Any Plans for Tonight (2006)
 Quiet Chaos (2008)
 The Seed of Discord (2008)
 4 padri single (2009)
 Many Kisses Later (2009)
 David's Birthday (2009)
 The Father and the Foreigner (2009)
 Natale a Beverly Hills (2009)
 Basilicata Coast to Coast (2010)
 The Woman of My Dreams (2010)
 Ex 2: Still Friends? (2011)
 Viva l'Italia (2012)
 The Dinner (2014)
 God Willing (2015)
 The Last Will Be the Last (2015)
 An Italian Name (2015)
 Torn (2015)
 Onda su onda (2016)
 Non c'è più religione (2016)
 Cinderella the Cat (2017)
 Ignorance Is Bliss(2017)
 The Prize (2017)
 Una storia senza nome (2018)
 All You Need Is Crime (2019)
 An Almost Ordinary Summer (2019)
 My Brother Chases Dinosaurs (2019)
 Though Shalt Not Hate (2020)
 Ritorno al crimine (2021)
 The Great Silence (2021)
 Il pataffio (2022)
 My Name Is Vendetta (2022)

TV
 Un bambino di nome Gesù, directed by Franco Rossi (1987)
 Il commissario Corso, directed by Gianni Lepre and Alberto Sironi (1987)
 Il giudice istruttore (1 episodio, 1987)
 L'altro enigma, directed by Vittorio Gassman and Carlo Tuzii (1988)
 Il commissario Corso (1 episode)
 La primavera di Michelangelo, directed by Jerry London (1991)
 Comprarsi una vita, directed by Domenico Campana (1991)
 Ulisse e la balena bianca, directed by Rubino Rubini (1992)
 Schneewittchen und das Geheimnis der Zwerge, directed by Ludvík Ráza (1992)
 Due volte vent'anni, directed by Livia Giampalmo (1993)
 La famiglia Ricordi, directed by Mauro Bolognini (1995)
 Sansone e Dalila, directed by Nicolas Roeg (1996)
 Nuda proprietà vendesi, directed by Enrico Oldoini (1997)
 Nessuno escluso, directed by Massimo Spano (1997)
 Crociati, directed by Dominique Othenin-Girard (2001)
 Piccolo mondo antico, directed by Cinzia Th. Torrini (2001)
 La guerra è finita, directed by Lodovico Gasparini (2002)
 Le stagioni del cuore, directed by Antonio Luigi Grimaldi (2004)
 Dalida, directed by Joyce Buñuel (2005)
 The Holy Family, directed by Raffaele Mertes (2006)
 Codice rosso (12 episodi, 2006)
 Pinocchio, directed by Alberto Sironi (2008)
 I Cesaroni (2 episodes, 2008)
 Natale per due, directed by Giambattista Avellino (2011)
 I bastardi... (2017)
 Io ti cercherò, a.k.a. Standing Tall'' (2020)

References

External links 
 

1965 births
20th-century Italian male actors
21st-century Italian male actors
David di Donatello winners
Italian male film actors
Italian male television actors
Italian people of French descent
Italian people of German descent
Italian people of Jewish descent
Living people
Male actors from Rome
Nastro d'Argento winners